Goldpokal der Stadt Bremerhaven was a basketball tournament played in the town of Bremerhaven in Bremen in West Germany, consisting of a men's tournament played between 1964-1983 and a men's tournament played between 1965-1969. The tournament was open both to club teams and national teams.

Winners

Men

Women

References 

International basketball competitions hosted by West Germany
Bremerhaven
Recurring sporting events established in 1964
Sport in Bremen (state)
1964 establishments in West Germany
1983 disestablishments in West Germany
Recurring sporting events disestablished in 1983